Agdan (also, Verin-Agdan and Verkhniy Agdan) is a town in the Tavush Province of Armenia.

References 

Geography of Tavush Province